Verin Ptghni, is a village in the Kotayk Province of Armenia.

See also 
Kotayk Province

References 
 (as Kerin Ptghni)

Populated places in Kotayk Province